Eutetrapha ocelota is a species of beetle in the family Cerambycidae. It was described by Henry Walter Bates in 1873, originally under the genus Glenea. It is known from Taiwan and Japan.

References

Saperdini
Beetles described in 1873